is a 2016 Japanese youth drama comedy film directed by , released on 5 March 2016.  A teaser trailer of this film was released in September 2015 and the film is a "spiritual sequel" to the 1981 film Sailor Suit and Machine Gun.

Synopsis
Izumi Hoshi (Kanna Hashimoto) is senior in high school. In the past, she led a small yakuza group, but the yakuza group was disbanded after she killed her uncle's murderer. Izumi now lives an ordinary life as a high school student and works as a manager at a cafe. That situation is soon to change.

Cast
Kanna Hashimoto as Izumi Hoshi
Hiroki Hasegawa as Tsukinaga
Masanobu Andō as Yasui
Takurō Ōno as Yuji
 as Haruo
Tetsuya Takeda as Yakuza boss Medaka

Awards and nominations

References

External links
 

The Japan Times' review

Japanese comedy-drama films
2016 comedy-drama films
Japanese sequel films
2016 films
2010s Japanese films

ja:セーラー服と機関銃#映画（2016年版）